Judith Lucy's Spiritual Journey is a six-part Australian television comedy series, starring and primarily written by comedian Judith Lucy.

Judith Lucy grew up so heavily Catholic that she wanted to become a nun. By the time she left school, she was a committed atheist. Now that she's convinced there must be something in between those two extremes, she embarks on a quest to discover something to believe in.

The series was directed by Lucy's long-time friend and collaborator Tony Martin, who also cameoed in one episode.

References

External links
Official ABC website

2011 Australian television series debuts
2011 Australian television series endings
Australian comedy television series
Australian Broadcasting Corporation original programming